Dudley Ryder may refer to:

Dudley Ryder, 1st Earl of Harrowby (1762–1847), British politician
Dudley Ryder, 2nd Earl of Harrowby (1798–1882), British politician
Dudley Ryder, 3rd Earl of Harrowby (1831–1900), British peer and politician
Dudley Ryder, 6th Earl of Harrowby (1892–1987), British peer and Conservative Member of Parliament
Dudley Ryder, 7th Earl of Harrowby (1922–2007), British banker
Dudley Ryder, 8th Earl of Harrowby (born 1951), British peer
Dudley Ryder (judge) (1691–1756), British Lord Chief Justice